Cluett Peabody & Company, Inc. once headquartered in Troy, New York, was a longtime manufacturer of shirts, detachable shirt cuffs and collars, and related apparel. It is best known for its Arrow brand collars and shirts and the related Arrow Collar Man advertisements (1905–1931). It dates, with a different name, from the mid-19th century and was absorbed by Westpoint Pepperell in the 1980s. The Arrow name is still licensed to brand men's shirts and ties.

The company manufactured shirts and collars in a historic building at 123 First Street in Leominster, Massachusetts.

The building was constructed in 1902 and added to the National Register of Historic Places in 1989.

History
The Arrow shirt company was founded by William H.Titus and his partner in Chicago, Illinois and in the late 1800s merged with Cluett Peabody.  Both companies had about $20 million in annual sales at the time of the merger.  Titus and his partner later became co-chairman of the company. Titus remained on the board of directors until the time of his death even though his residence was in Glencoe, Illinois.

In 1851, Maullin & Blanchard, manufacturers of collars, began operations at 282 River Street in Troy, NY. This company was succeeded in 1856 by Maullin & Bigelow, and in 1861 by Maullin, Bigelow, & Co., when Mr. George B. Cluett, a clerk in the company since 1854, became a partner. Upon the dissolution of the partnership in 1862, Joseph Maullin and George B. Cluett formed the firm Maullin & Cluett. On the death of Mr. Maullin in 1863, the firm Geo. B. Cluett, Bros., & Co. was formed.

In 1891, Geo. B. Cluett, Bros., & Co merged with Coon & Co., also of Troy, NY, to form Cluett, Coon & Co., bringing Frederick F. Peabody into the firm. The Cluett, Coon & Co soon became the Cluett, Peabody & Co. in 1899.

Prior to 1919, the principal business for Cluett, Peabody & Co. was manufacturing men's shirt collars. Beginning in the 1920s the demand for collar-attached shirts grew considerably, while the detached collar business experienced a decline. In 1929 Cluett, Peabody & Co. established a national menswear business under the Arrow brand name. The "Arrow" name gradually grew into a product line that included shirts, collars, handkerchiefs, cravats, pajamas, and underwear for men and boys.

By 1935 Cluett Peabody operated eleven plants, mostly in the Northeast, including a plant at 123 First Street in Leominster, MA. In 1945 sales for Cluett Peabody were $31.3 million, and by 1955 sales had nearly tripled, to $87.4 million. At their heyday, the owned plants numbered 13 with an additional two in a wholly owned subsidiary and the weekly production approximated 67,700 dozen. In addition in the mid 70's the company arranged production from contractors of an additional weekly 31,000 dz. for a total 98,700 dozen. At this time additional shirt production lines were being contracted from Korea.

Cluett, Peabody & Co. was acquired by WestPoint Pepperell, Inc in 1985. Bidermann Industries purchased Cluett, Peabody & Co. from WestPoint Pepperell in 1990. Cluett American Group (Vestar Capital Partners) bought the company in 1998. In 2004, Phillips-Van Heusen Corporation (parent company of longtime archrival Van Heusen) acquired the Arrow brand and the related licensing business from Cluett American Group for approximately $70 million. The remaining elements of the Cluett American Group now operate as Gold Toe Brands (GTB Holding Corp). GTB Holding Corp still holds the trademark licensing rights to the Sanforization process of pre-shrinking fabric, named for its inventor, Sanford L. Cluett, who developed the process for Cluett, Peabody & Co, which he joined in 1919. On June 23, 2021, it was announced that the Arrow brand would be sold to Authentic Brands Group alongside Van Heusen, Izod, and Geoffrey Beene. The sale closed on August 2, 2021. Under ABG, United Legwear & Apparel Co. was named as the licensee for the Arrow brand.

See also
National Register of Historic Places listings in Worcester County, Massachusetts

References

External links

 New York Rensselaer County Historical Museum. (Containing history of Cluett Peabody and the Arrow Shirt Company.)

Industrial buildings and structures on the National Register of Historic Places in Massachusetts
Buildings and structures in Leominster, Massachusetts
National Register of Historic Places in Worcester County, Massachusetts